The 1915 Copa Ibarguren was the 3rd. edition of this National cup of Argentina. It was played by the champions of both leagues, Primera División and Liga Rosarina de Football crowned during 1915.

Racing (Primera División champion) faced Rosario Central (Liga Rosarina champion) at Independiente Stadium on Mitre Ave and Lacarra (known as La Crucecita) in Avellaneda, on March 26, 1916. After the match ended 0–0 and no goal was scored during the extra time, a playoff was scheduled for April 30 at Gimnasia y Esgrima de Buenos Aires Stadium.

In the playoff match, Rosario Central won 3–1 on extra time, achieving its second title in the first division.

Qualified teams 

Note

Venues

Match details

Final

Playoff

References

i
i
1915 in Argentine football
1915 in South American football
Football in Avellaneda
Football in Buenos Aires